In Darkness and in Light is a 2011 short film distributed by Warner Bros., scripted by Ian Kintzle, from a story by Kintzle and John O'Callaghan, and  directed by James Sullos and Mike Jones. The film is packaged with a boxset of music from the American rock band The Maine, and is sold exclusively on iTunes.

Plot
The film is a tale about a small band of contumacious boys and girls that live in a hidden village on a faraway beach; they are the Ivory Rebellion, a feral group of children that are fighting from oppression against an evil queen named Johanna, and her ruthless Onyx Empire. Like Peter Pan & The Lost Boys, the rebels have shunned society and live completely free of parents and authority figures. Their existence, albeit a simple one, is entirely devoid of technology, minus simple firearms and an ancient tube radio. Surrounding their beach is a border, the land across from which is forbidden and belongs to the Onyx Empire. For the longest time a treaty was set forth, stating that no one from either side shall cross said border, but in a last-ditch effort to induct the boys and girls of the Ivory Rebellion, Queen Johanna has halted all supply shipments into their village. The rebels are running low on food, and with the threat of starvation, are forced to make a decision that could cost them everything.

Music box set
All music by The Maine

"Untangle Me" (B-Side) - 3:20
"Free" (Home Recording) - 3:22
"Book of Me and You" (Home Recording) - 3:00
"Whoever She Is" (Home Recording) - 4:01
"Growing Up" (Live Acoustic Song) - 4:03
"Washroom Color" - 2:26
"Saving Grace" (Take 2) – 4:07
"In Darkness & In Light (Movie Score) - 18:11

 Tracks 5 through 7 are all acoustic/alternate renditions of songs off Black & White, while tracks 1 through 4 are also included on the European CD version of Black & White.

References

External links
 

2011 films
2011 fantasy films
American fantasy films
2010s English-language films
2010s American films